Héctor Suárez Gomís (born December 6, 1968) is a Mexican actor and former singer. Formerly known as Héctor Suárez Jr. and Héctor Suárez hijo, he is the son of Héctor Suárez, who was also an actor and of Pepita Gomís a television host.

Career
He was born in Mexico City and started his acting career as part of the cast of the play Vaselina, the Spanish language version of Grease. He immediately obtained a role in the telenovela Principessa on Televisa. Five years later he recorded his first album alternating with his work on television. In 1991 he made his first movie and next year he participated in the film version of the telenovela Alcanzar una estrella, after participating in the telenovela version of it and its sequel.

Films
 One Long Night (2007) .... Felix
 Corazón marchito (2004)
 El tesoro de Clotilde (1994)
 La quebradita (1994) as Víctor
 Más que alcanzar una estrella (1992) as Alejandro
 Tres son peor que una (1992) as Enrique
 Federal de narcóticos (División Cobra) (1991)

Talk shows
 El pelón de la noche (2004)

Sitcoms
 Diseñador ambos sexos (2001) as Juan Felipe Martínez 'Jean Phillipe Martin'
 Salud, dinero y amor (1997) as El Tacubayo

Telenovelas

Imagen Television
 Muy padres (2017) as Ricardo Pérez Valdez

TV Azteca
 Amor sin Condiciones (2006) as Braulio
 Mirada de mujer: El regreso (2003)

Televisa
 Por Siempre mi Amor (2013) as Fernando
 Como dice el dicho (2013) as Federico 
 Carita de ángel (2000) as Omar Gasca
 Infierno en el Paraíso (1999) as Ricardo Selma
 Preciosa (1998) as Lorenzo 'Pantera' Ortiz
 El premio mayor (1995) as El Tacubayo
 Sueño de amor (1993)
 Alcanzar una estrella II (1991) as Pedro
 Alcanzar una estrella (1990) as Pedro
 Mi segunda madre (1989)
 Un nuevo amanecer (1988) as Pavo
 Principessa (1984)

Telemundo

'Til Jail Do Us Part (2022) as Alberto
100 días para enamorarnos (2020–2021) as Luis Casas
Betty en NY (2019) as Hugo Lombardi
Zorro: La Espada y la Rosa (2007) as Capitán Anibal Pizarro
El Juramento (2008)

Theater
 P.D. Tu gato ha muerto ("P.S. Your Cat Is Dead")
 Vaselina ("Grease", 1984) as Ricky Rockero

Albums
 Con Ganas de Amar (1991)
 Quiero Todo de Ti (1989)

External links
  Telemundo Website
  Official "El Juramento" Website
 Héctor Suárez Gomís at the Telenovela database
 
 Héctor Suárez Gomís  at esmas.com

1968 births
Mexican male singers
Mexican male child actors
Mexican male film actors
Mexican male stage actors
Mexican male telenovela actors
Mexican male television actors
Mexican television presenters
Male actors from Mexico City
Living people
Singers from Mexico City